Los Cuñaos  is an eight-part vocal group established in Caracas, Venezuela in 1974. Their repertoire is based on popular Venezuelan songs adapted to their own unique style of singing, performing  a crossover of traditional and pop genres while contrasting their work with rich and warm harmonies.

History
The group was formed by musician Alí Agüero, who came to sing with the Onda Nueva group created and led by Aldemaro Romero. The Onda Nueva (New Wave) is a genre derived from the Venezuelan joropo and the Brazilian bossa nova, which has a few slight nods to jazz and classical music.

In essence, Los Cuñaos is a studio vocal group, as they are jingle singers, the core members of a fellowship that used to gather daily in recording studios to sing a short song or tune used in advertising and for other commercial uses. Individually, they are totally unknown to popular music listeners, even though their singing was heard day and night on television and radio across Venezuela. At the time, most of the top jingle singers in Venezuela drifted into the business from the pop music world.

Los Cuñaos made their first public appearance at Aula Magna of the Central University of Venezuela late in 1974. The group later toured Chile, Puerto Rico, Mexico and United States.

Selected repertory

Adios
Alma llanera
Ayúdame / Cuando no sé de ti / Te necesito / Ansiedad
Barlovento / San Juan to' lo tiene
Caballo viejo
Canchunchú dichoso / Caramba
Caracas / Cimarrón
Carmen
Carretera / Me gusta soñar
Chucho y Ceferina
Conde a Principal
Crepúsculo coriano
Dama antañona / Mujer merideña
Danzas orientales / Maremare / El robalo / La burriquita
El ausente / Brumas del mar
El cumaco de San Juan / Mónica Pérez
El muñeco de la ciudad / El carite
El raspao'
Esquina la Bolsa
Fantasía criolla
Flor de Mayo / Ahora
Florentino y el Diablo
La chipola
La Ruperta / El perico / Préstame tu máquina
Maracaibo en la noche / Pregones de la Plaza Baralt
Maria Elena / Adios a Ocumare
Niño lindo
Olor a Navidad / Grey Zuliana
Poco a poco
Polo coriano
Pueblos tristes
Quinta Anauco / Y llueve todavía
Quitapesares / Amándonos
Ricciardi
San Juan se va / Moliendo café
Serenata
Tu ternura / Anhelante
Zumba que zumba

Discography

References

External links
"Cuñaos" que no son "cuñaos" (Spanish). El Universal. Retrieved on December 12, 2015.
List of You Tube videos

1974 establishments in Venezuela
1981 disestablishments in Venezuela
Musical groups established in 1974
Musical groups disestablished in 1981
Venezuelan folk singers
Venezuelan musical groups